A meadowlark is a bird belonging to the genus Sturnella in the New World family Icteridae.

Meadowlark or Meadowlarks may also refer to:


Arts and entertainment
 The Meadowlarks, a musical group
 Meadowlark (band), a British indie pop duo
 "Meadowlark" (song), from the musical The Baker's Wife
 "Meadowlarks", a song from the album Fleet Foxes by Fleet Foxes
 Meadowlark, protagonist of the novel Shopping

Transportation
 Meadowlark (train), operated by the Chicago and Eastern Illinois Railroad
 Meadowlark Airport, a former airport in Southern California
 Meadowlark Ultralight Meadowlark, an ultralight aircraft

Other uses
 Meadowlark Lemon (1932-2015), American basketball player and actor
 Northampton Meadowlarks, a minor league baseball team
 USS Meadowlark (AMS-196), a coastal minesweeper
 Meadowlark Botanical Gardens, Vienna, Virginia, United States
 Meadowlark, a holistic retreat created by Evarts G. Loomis

See also
 Meadow Lark Lake, Wyoming, United States, an unincorporated community
 Meadowlark Park (disambiguation)